The 13th Nuestra Belleza México pageant, was held at the Espacio Cultural Metropolitano of Tampico, Tamaulipas, Mexico on September 2, 2006. Thirty contestants of the Mexican Republic competed for the national title, which was won by Rosa Maria Ojeda from Sinaloa, who later competed in Miss Universe 2007 in Mexico where she was a Semifinalist in the Top 10. Ojeda was crowned by outgoing Nuestra Belleza México titleholder Priscila Perales. She was the second Sinaloan to win this title.

The Nuestra Belleza Mundo México title was won by Carolina Morán from Colima, who later competed in Miss World 2007 in China where she was the 2nd Runner-up. Morán was crowned by Nuestra Belleza Mundo México 2004 Dafne Molina. She is the only Coliman and fourth winner of foreign descent (her grandfather is Chinese) to win this Title.

The Recognition "Corona al Mérito 2006" was for Dafne Molina, Nuestra Belleza Mundo México 2004, 1st Runner-up in Miss World 2005 and International Top Model.

Results

Placements

Order of announcements

Top 15
Tamaulipas
Colima
Jalisco
Daitrito Federal
Michoacán
Sinaloa
Chihuahua
Nuevo León
Puebla
Baja California
Coahuila
Nuevo León
Nayarit
Sonora
Jalisco

Top 10
Chihuahua
Baja California
Nayarit
Tamaulipas
Sinaloa
Jalisco
Michoacán
Nuevo León
Puebla
Colima

Top 5
Tamaulipas
Baja California
Colima
Jalisco
Sinaloa

Special awards

Judges
They were the same judges at the Preliminary and Final Competition.
Alicia Machado - Miss Universe 1996 & Actress
Arturo Carmona - Actor
Gerardo Dragonetti - Fashion Designer
Héctor Terrones - Fashion Designer
Marco Méndez - Actor
Natalia Esperón - Actress
Odín Dupeyrón - Actor
Rebeca Tamez - Nuestra Belleza México 1996, Señorita Continente Americano 1997 & Fashion Model
Denisse Carrera de Esper - Nuestra Belleza Tamaulipas 1994
Laura de la Torre - Fuller Brand Director

Background music
Opening Number: "Medley of the host State" by Contestants
Intermediate: "Vanidosa" by Bobby Pulido
Swimsuit Competition: "Guapa" by Santo Diablito
Intermediate: "Rosa Pastel" by Belanova
Evening Gown Competition: Leo Paryna
Intermediate: "Y Aquí Estoy" by Fey
Crowning Moment: "Nuestra Belleza México" (Official Theme)

Contestants

Designates
 - Ana Paulina Parga
 - Perla Mercado
 - Alejandra Ballesteros

Returning states
Last competed in 2002:

Last competed in 2005:

Withdrawals
 Estado de México

Significance
Sinaloa won the Nuestra Belleza México title for the second time (before 2003).
This year the crown of Nuestra Belleza México suffers his third change, this new model would continue only this year.
Colima won the Nuestra Belleza Mundo México title for the first time.
This was the fourth time a Winner of Nuestra Belleza México pageant is of foreign descent (Carolina Morán, her grandfather is Chinese).
Jalisco was the Suplente/1st Runner-up for the first time.
The event begins with a parade of costumes, it's not carried out since 1998.
This is the first year in which the outgoing Queen, Nuestra Belleza Mundo México 2005 Karla Jiménez, doesn't give the crown to her successor because of her participation in Miss World 2006 in Warsaw, Poland; Nuestra Belleza Mundo México 2004 and 1st Runner-up in Miss World 2005 Dafne Molina give the crown to the successor.
Chihuahua, Guerrero and San Luis Potosí return to competition after two years (2004), Chiapas after four years (2002).
Tamaulipas placed for eighth consecutive year.
Distrito Federal, Jalisco and Nuevo León placed for fourth consecutive year.
Baja California and Puebla placed for second consecutive year.
Nayarit returned to making calls to the semifinals after eight years (1998), Colima after six years (2000), Sinaloa and Sonora after three years (2003), Chihuahua, Coahuila and Michoacán after two years (2004).
States that were called to the semifinals last year and this year failed to qualify were Aguascalientes, Baja California Sur, Durango, Guanajuato, Morelos, Quintana Roo, Veracruz, Yucatán and Zacatecas.
For the first time Juan José Origel hosted Nuestra Belleza México, with Jacqueline Bracamontes who was on her second time.
Tamaulipas won Miss Top Model for the first time and the Best Hair Award for third time (before 1999 and 2001)..
Colima won Contestants' Choice for the first time.
Jalisco won Miss Talent, the Steps to Fame Award and Best National Costume for the first time.
Distrito Federal won Miss Sports for the first time.
Michoacán won the Academic Award for the first time.
Sinaloa won Fuller Beauty Queen for the first time.
Puebla won the Best Skin Award for the first time.
Chihuahua won the Lala Light Figure Award for the first time.
The host delegate, Adriana Celis from Tamaulipas, placed to semifinals.
Aguascalientes (Ana Paulina Parga) is the tallest delegate in this edition (1.82 m).
Chihuahua (Montserrat Montagut), Morelos (Karla Soto) and Quintana Roo (Mercedes Cortina) are the shortest delegates in this edition (1.68 m).

Contestants notes
 - Alejandra Espinoza is a Mexican beauty queen. She won the first year of Univision's beauty contest/reality television show Nuestra Belleza Latina 2007 on May 22, 2007, being the first Mexican to win the crown. Espinoza currently works on Sabado Gigante starring Don Francisco. She has appeared several times on El Gordo y La Flaca covering for Lili Estefan. She is represented by MC2 Model Management in Miami.
 - Montserrat Montagut represented Mexico in the Reinado Internacional del Café 2007 where she was the 3rd Runner-up.
 - Carolina Morán is a Mexican model who represented her country in Miss World 2007, which took place on December 1, 2007 at the Crown of Beauty Theatre in Sanya, People's Republic of China, where she placed as the 2nd Runner-up, obtaining the title of Miss World Americas 2007, she also was a semifinalist in the fast track competitions: Top 5 in Miss World Beach Beauty, Top 16 in Miss World Sports and 2nd Runner-up in Miss World Top Model.She is a Professional Model and currently she studies Political Science.
 - Pilar Pérez was born in Culiacán, Sinaloa but lived most of her life in Guanajuato. She currently co-hosts ESPN Deportes sports talk show Nación ESPN.
 - Gladys Castellanos represented Mexico in Miss Continente Americano 2007 held in Palacio de Cristal in Guayaquil, Ecuador where she won the 3rd place. She is currently TV Hostess in Televisa Guadalajara.
 - Tania Rincón is a TV Hostess in TV Azteca.
 - Mercedes Cortina was born in Aguascalientes, but she lives for several years in Cancún.
 - Rosa María Ojeda at 15 years of age, she was diagnosed thyroid cancer. After overcoming such unfortunate events during her childhood, she competed in the national beauty pageant Nuestra Belleza México, as well as obtain the right to represent her country in the 2007 Miss Universe pageant. She became the second woman from the state of Sinaloa to win the title since the Nuestra Belleza México pageant first began in 1994. On May 28, 2007, Ojeda placed as a Top 10 finalist in Miss Universe 2007 held at the Auditorio Nacional in Mexico City, Mexico. Previously she also was a finalist in Miss Expo World 2002. Also she was Miss Turismo México Internacional 2004. She is a Professional Model.
 - Melissa Estrella was the first delegate that represented Mexico in the contest Reina Hispanoamericana 2007 where she won the Miss Congeniality award. This contest was held at the FEXPO, in Santa Cruz, Bolivia on October 26, 2007.
 - Adriana Celis is sister of Alejandra Celis, Nuestra Belleza Tamaulipas 2003.
 - Deyanira Varela competed at the contest Nuestra Belleza Latina 2008 representing Mexico, she ended up in 10th place. In 2010 she was detained by Jalisco state authorities to be surprised with her boyfriend in possession of 6 stolen cars after a long stretch of investigations, she was found not guilty.

Crossovers

Contestants who had competed or will compete at other beauty pageants:

Miss Universe
 2007: : Rosa María Ojeda (Top 10)

Miss World
 2007: : Carolina Morán (2nd Runner-up)

Miss Continente Americano
 2007: : Gladys Castellanos (2nd Runner-up)

Reina Hispanoamericana
 2007: : Melissa Estrella

Reinado Internacional del Café
 2007: : Montserrat Montagut (3rd Runner-up)

Nuestra Belleza Latina
 2007: : Alejandra Espinoza (Winner)
 's representative
 2008: : Deyanira Varela (11th Runner-up)
 's representative

Miss Turismo México
 2004: : Rosa María Ojeda (Winner)

References

External links
Official Website

.Mexico
2006 in Mexico
2006 beauty pageants